Lisa Edel O'Rourke (born 13 May 2002) is an Irish amateur boxer who won a gold medal at the 2022 World Championships in the light middleweight division.

References

Living people
Irish women boxers
AIBA Women's World Boxing Championships medalists
2002 births
21st-century Irish women